Santiam Pass is a  mountain pass in the Cascade Range in central Oregon in the United States. Several other smaller volcanoes, including cinder cones and tuyas, are found near the summit of the pass. U.S. Route 20 connects eastern Oregon with the valley of the Santiam River on the west via Santiam Pass. One of the 19 or 20 lakes by the name of Lost Lake is located beside the highway just west of Santiam Pass. The pass may be approached from the west by three distinct routes:
 Oregon Route 22, also known as the  North Santiam Highway, proceeds southeast from Salem and follows the North Santiam River to Santiam Junction.
 U.S. Route 20, which follows the South Santiam River from the Albany–Corvallis area to Santiam Junction.
 Oregon Route 126, which follows the McKenzie River northeast from Eugene.

From the east, Santiam Pass is approached from the town of Sisters; however, immediately east of Sisters, U. S. Highway 20 and Oregon Route 126, which share the route over the pass, split with Oregon Route 126 going northeast to Redmond and Prineville, Oregon and U. S. Route 20 heading southeast to Bend.

History
While the pass was known by native peoples, the first recorded crossing of the pass was in April 1859 by an expedition searching for a cattle trail over the Cascade Range from the Willamette Valley to Central Oregon. This expedition was led by Andrew Wiley, who reportedly climbed a tall tree on a mountain near Lost Prairie to help determine the route. Lost Prairie is located along Hackleman Creek between Fish Lake and Tombstone Prairie. Wiley later helped establish the Santiam Wagon Road.

Originally known as Hogg Pass, after Col. T. Egenton Hogg who designated this crossing for his proposed railroad, Santiam Pass was renamed in 1929 when the Santiam Highway was completed. The original Santiam Pass is located three miles south and was discovered in 1859.

Nearby volcanoes
 Three Fingered Jack
 Hogg Rock
 Hoodoo Butte
 Hayrick Butte
 Mount Washington

See also
 McKenzie Pass – Santiam Pass Scenic Byway
 Santiam Junction State Airport, located west of the pass along U.S. Route 20

References

Mountain passes of Oregon
Mountain passes of the Cascades
Transportation in Linn County, Oregon
Transportation in Jefferson County, Oregon
Landforms of Linn County, Oregon
Deschutes National Forest
Willamette National Forest
Landforms of Jefferson County, Oregon
U.S. Route 20